Arthur Hinton Rosenfeld (June 22, 1926 – January 27, 2017) was a UC Berkeley physicist and California energy commissioner, dubbed the "Godfather of Energy Efficiency", for developing new standards which helped improve energy efficiency in California and subsequently worldwide.

Rosenfeld was born in Birmingham, Alabama, in 1926. Starting in 1954 he served as a professor of physics at the University of California at Berkeley and a senior staff member at Lawrence Berkeley National Laboratory. In 1994, he served in the Clinton administration as Senior Advisor at the U.S. Department of Energy. In 2000, he was appointed Commissioner of the California Energy Commission, serving until his retirement in 2010.

His work helped lead to such breakthroughs as low-energy electric lights, such as compact fluorescent lamps, low-energy refrigerators, and windows that trap heat. In his fight against global warming, he has saved Americans billions of dollars in electricity bills.

Early years and education
Rosenfeld was born in Birmingham, Alabama on June 22, 1926. He spent his early years in New Orleans during the Great Depression. His father was an expert in sugar cane cultivation, which took the family to Egypt when he was six years old. As a student in Egypt, he made friends with students from Europe, and learned about their inclination to saving energy. "Europeans only used half as much energy ... and it was clear that their lifestyle was as good as ours," he later said.

While still in high school, he took college-level courses, which helped him earn a bachelor's degree from Virginia Polytechnic Institute when he was 17. He served in the U.S. Navy for two years at the end of World War II, where he taught radar operations. He next entered graduate school at the University of Chicago, and studied particle physics under Enrico Fermi, a Nobel Prize-winning Italian physicist. Rosenfeld coauthored a book on nuclear physics with Fermi, who was noted for building the world's first nuclear reactor.

In 1954, after earning his PhD in physics, and with a recommendation from Fermi, Rosenfeld accepted a position as a teaching physicist at the University of California, Berkeley.

Career

Physics professor
At Berkeley, Rosenfeld joined the University of California Department of Physics and the particle physics research group at Lawrence Berkeley National Lab (LBNL) led by Nobel Laureate Luis Alvarez. Alvarez went on to win the Nobel Prize with research backed by his team of scientists that included Rosenfeld.

In 1957, he became professor of physics, later professor emeritus, and was one of the founding members of the international Particle Data Group.  He developed the reputation of being a workaholic, arriving to work very early, taking a dinner break with his family, and continuing to work until 2 a.m.

Energy efficiency leader

A turning point in his career came as a result of the second Arab oil embargo in 1973, when he realized that one of the key vulnerabilities of Americans was their inefficient and wasteful use of limited energy. The embargo caused an energy crisis, with long lines at gas stations and higher energy prices nationwide.

He was annoyed at seeing colleagues in his building leaving lights on at the end of the day, and took it upon himself to go throughout the building turning them off. At the same time, California utilities were projecting a 7 percent annual growth in electric demand, and were planning to build a number of nuclear power plants along the coast.

His mission changed when he became convinced, as he said, "it would be more profitable to attack our own wasteful energy use than to attack OPEC." He noted that "if we Americans used energy as efficiently as do the Europeans or Japanese, we would have been exporting oil in 1973." While most researchers at the time were trying to find ways of producing more energy, Rosenfeld committed himself from then on to reducing energy use.

As a result, his research focus shifted away from particle physics and instead to energy efficiency. To organize a team of scientists to work on it, he established the Center for Building Science at Lawrence Berkeley National Laboratory, which he would lead until 1994. Ashok Gadgil, a senior scientist at the lab, who had once been one of Rosenfeld's graduate students, explains that Rosenfeld was the first to calculate how much energy would be saved with new standards. "It was a revelation," says Gadgil, when they looked at the projected savings.

Energy efficiency standards developed
The center under his leadership developed a number of energy efficiency technologies, including heat trapping window coating and compact fluorescent lights.  Rosenfeld helped develop computer models used to understand and calculate the energy use of buildings. Those computer models were later adopted as national standards for building energy analysis by the Department of Energy.

Rosenfeld's attention to energy conservation inspired thousands of energy researchers during his career. "He truly shaped the way an entire generation of researchers and policymakers worked together to conserve resources," said Berkeley Lab director Mike Witherell. Engineers, beginning with those in his lab, now began to analyze the energy efficiency of everyday things. That led to breakthroughs in not only low-energy lights, but also windows, refrigerators, air conditioners, and other appliances, along with the design of entire buildings. It led to California becoming a model of energy conservation for the nation, and in 1978 it was the first state to approve a strong energy-efficiency building code, called Title 24.

He developed DOE-2, a computer program for building energy analysis and design that was incorporated into the new code. The codes themselves became models for other states, copied by Florida and Massachusetts, among them. DOE-2 is used to calculate codes and guidelines for energy efficient new buildings by various countries, including China.

Other states and countries became aware that although homes in California were loaded with new energy-consuming appliances, such as computers, large-screen TVs, iPods, PlayStations, central air conditioners, hot tubs and swimming pools, their per person energy use had remained the same as it was 30 years earlier. Much of the savings was attributed to Rosenfeld's "passion to wring the most out of every kilowatt." He gave energy regulators the data they needed to enact some of the strongest efficiency standards in the world.

Those standards impacted various industries: New homes and buildings were required to have better insulation and to be fitted with energy-saving lights; heating and cooling systems had to be more efficient; appliances were redesigned to use less power; and utilities were told to motivate their customers to use less electricity. Rosenfeld acted on his basic principle: "Conserving energy is cheaper and smarter than building power plants."

While the pressure to build nuclear facilities was growing as the population grew, utilities and policymakers began to agree that new power plants were not always needed. In 1976, for instance, after he explained to California governor Jerry Brown that a proposed nuclear power plant would not be needed if there were better efficiency standards for refrigerators, the proposed plant was not built. And the following year, standards for new refrigerators and freezers went into effect. Brown recalls Rosenfeld's influence:

Energy savings and reduced pollution

Many of the new standards met with stiff resistance from utilities and business groups. They saw the new rules as being bureaucratic "job killers," and which, if effective, would reduce their revenues. An executive from the utilities contacted Rosenfeld's lab to demand they fire him.

Appliance manufacturers also complained about the new requirements, although they innovated to meet them. The resistance from utilities and manufacturers was eventually overcome when it was calculated that those new standards had yielded billions annually in energy savings for California consumers. "The first time we put standards on a product, we tend to get objections that this will be the ruin of civilization as we know it," Rosenfeld said. "But then people get used to it." In 1999, he estimated that the changes the commission mandated were saving the nation $10 billion a year.

The new standards also reduced California's air pollution, equivalent to taking millions of cars off the road. Appliances such as the refrigerator later used only 25% of the energy as older models, despite often being larger. Large-screen TVs, which were estimated to previously use up to 10% of an average home's electricity, were also included in the standards. In 2009, California approved the nation's first efficiency requirement for televisions. It was estimated that they alone would save Californian's $8 billion over the following decade.

Since 1973 per capita electricity use in California has remained flat, while for the rest of the nation it increased nearly 50%. That trend was attributed in part to the energy conservation efforts led by Rosenfeld. Energy scientists credited Rosenfeld for those savings, dubbing the term "Rosenfeld Effect" as a way to explain how the cost reductions were achieved. He became a "rock star" in energy efficiency circles. James Sweeney, an energy scientist at Stanford, says Rosenfeld is "absolutely the most fundamental person in causing the California government to start paying attention fully to the opportunities for energy efficiency."

Energy efficiency organizations

Governor Brown subsequently set up California's first Energy Commission, requiring as part of its mandate the use of the new efficiency standards for buildings and appliances. Rosenfeld was appointed its Commissioner by Gov. Gray Davis in 2000 and was reappointed by Gov. Arnold Schwarzenegger in 2005.

His efforts, having saved consumers billions of dollars in energy costs, earned Rosenfeld the moniker, "godfather of energy efficiency," as well as numerous awards.

In 1980 Rosenfeld helped form the American Council for an Energy-Efficient Economy (ACEEE), a non-profit organization aimed at promoting energy efficiency policies and technologies. In 2014, leading members of the organization paid tribute to his work, with many of its members crediting him for giving them inspiration during their careers. At that event, Rosenfeld said that his own inspiration for establishing the organization was his "fury" at President Jimmy Carter's plan to spend $88 billion on alternative fuel development, but almost nothing toward energy conservation. He realized that someone with his expertise was needed to re-focus attention to conserving energy, which he felt was the best and easiest way to reduce energy consumption.

Rosenfeld is the author or co-author of about 400 peer-reviewed scientific papers. He was a participant, and later member of the Board of Directors for the non-profit research organization Berkeley Earth. From 1994 to 1999, Rosenfeld was a senior advisor for Energy Efficiency and Renewable Energy in the United States Department of Energy.

In later years, he was a leading advocate for the use of white or light colored roofing materials to reduce building cooling costs. Former U.S. Secretary of Energy, Steven Chu, explains that by Rosenfeld's calculation, having white roofs on all flat-roofed buildings and for pavements, would be the equivalent of removing all the cars in the world for 18 years. In 2005 California added cool roofs to its Title 24 building standards.

Personal life and death
Rosenfeld died at his home in Berkeley, California on January 27, 2017, aged 90. The cause of his death was pneumonia.  His wife of 53 years, Roselyn Bernheim "Roz" Rosenfeld, had died in 2009.  His son Chip Rosenfeld died in 1994 at age 27 while a graduate student at Harvard University.

He is survived by two daughters, Dr. Margaret Rosenfeld at the University of Washington Children's Hospital in Seattle and Dr. Anne Hansen at Harvard Children's Hospital in Boston;  His sons-in-law Professor Daniel S. Weld, University of Washington, and Professor Jonathan Hansen, Harvard. He had six grandchildren:  Oliver, Julian and Nathalie Hansen & Adam, Galen and Leah Weld,  ages 22 to 16 as of 2017.

Honors and recognition

Rosenfeld's law. He is credited with an observation known as Rosenfeld's law, which states that the amount of energy required to produce one dollar of GDP has decreased by about one percent per year since 1845.

Rosenfeld Effect. To explain how California's per capita electricity usage managed to stay flat for 40 years, while usage for the nation went 50 percent higher, the term "Rosenfeld effect" was created.
The Rosenfeld: a unit of measure. In 2010, over fifty leaders from 26 institutions worldwide in the field of energy efficiency, proposed a new unit to represent electricity savings, and named it the "Rosenfeld".
 Honorary degree, Durham University, 1983

Awards
 Szilard Award for Physics in the Public Interest, 1986
 Carnot Award for Energy Efficiency, U.S. Department of Energy, 1993
 Berkeley Citation, University of California, 2001
 Enrico Fermi Award, 2006
 Economist Innovator of the Year Award, 2008
 National Association of Engineering (NAE) Membership, 2010
 Global Energy Prize (Russia), 2011
 National Medal of Technology (U.S.), 2011
 Tang Prize in Sustainable Development, 2016

Notes

References

External links
Art Rosenfeld website
Presentations, Publications and Media Coverage
Biography from the California Energy Commission 
EcoGeek article about Rosenfeld
Named the 2005 Enrico Fermi Award Winner
Ode to Arthur H. Rosenfeld, Doctor Efficiency
Video of Art Rosenfeld talking about his work, from the National Science & Technology Medals Foundation

1926 births
2017 deaths
University of Chicago alumni
University of California, Berkeley faculty
Sustainability advocates
American physicists
Members of the United States National Academy of Engineering
Enrico Fermi Award recipients
People from New Orleans
Scientists from the San Francisco Bay Area
20th-century American Jews
Fellows of the American Physical Society
21st-century American Jews